Alicia Suskin Ostriker (born November 11, 1937) is an American poet and scholar who writes Jewish feminist poetry. 
She was called "America's most fiercely honest poet" by Progressive. Additionally, she was one of the first women poets in America to write and publish poems discussing the topic of motherhood. In 2015, she was elected a Chancellor of the Academy of American Poets. In 2018, she was named the New York State Poet Laureate.

Personal life and education
Ostriker was born in Brooklyn, New York, to David Suskin and Beatrice Linnick Suskin.  She grew up in the Manhattan housing projects during the Great Depression. Her father worked for New York City Parks Department. Her mother read her William Shakespeare and Robert Browning, and Alicia began writing poems, as well as drawing, from an early age. Initially, she had hoped to be an artist and studied art as a teenager. Her books, Songs (1969) and A Dream of Springtime (1979), spotlight her own illustrations. Ostriker went to high school at Ethical Culture Fieldston School in 1955.

She holds a bachelor's degree from Brandeis University (1959), and an M.A. (1961) and Ph.D. (1964) from the University of Wisconsin–Madison. In Ostriker's first year of graduate school, she attended a conference where a visiting professor commented on her poetry by saying, "'You women poets are very graphic, aren't you?'" This comment caused her to reflect on the meaning of being a woman poet. She had never thought of that term before and she realized that men were uncomfortable when women wrote about their own bodies. This encounter became a defining moment in her life and from that moment on, she wrote poems discussing the various facets of a woman: sexuality, motherhood, pregnancy, and mortality. On the other hand, her doctoral dissertation, on the work of William Blake, became her first book, Vision and Verse in William Blake (1965). Later, she edited and annotated Blake's complete poems for Penguin Press.

She is married to astronomer Jeremiah P. Ostriker, who taught at Princeton University (1971–2001). They have three children: Rebecca (1963), Eve (1965), and Gabriel (1970). She has been a resident of Princeton, New Jersey.

Career and work
She began her teaching career at Rutgers University in 1965 and has served as an English professor until she retired in 2004. Ostriker decided to pursue a career while also taking care of her children which was very uncommon during this time. Ostriker's ambition, desire to live a life different from her mother's, and her husband's refusal to let her become a housewife influenced her to make that choice. In 1969, her first collection of poems, Songs, was published by Holt, Rinehart and Winston. This collection contained poems that she wrote while she was still a student. Her poems reflect the influence poets such as Gerard Manley Hopkins, John Keats, W.H. Auden, William Blake, and Walt Whitman have had on her and her poetry.

Her second collection of poems published was Once More Out of Darkness. Majority of the poems were written in free verse. While she was writing this collection of poems, Ostriker became aware of her feminist views. The poems that compose this collection were based on her first two experiences of pregnancy and childbirth as she had her first two children 18 months apart. Discussing these topics in her poems made her cognizant of the fact that she had not previously read poems about these topics and that she was breaking a taboo. Her third volume of poems, A Dream of Springtime, had poems that demonstrated her growth by discussing her emerging from her past and discovering herself and her identity.

Her fourth book of poems, The Mother/Child Papers (1980), a feminist classic, was inspired by the birth of her son during the Vietnam War and weeks after the Kent State shootings. Throughout, she juxtaposes musings about motherhood with musings about war. She also discusses her husband and her other two children in her poems. This collection allowed her to explore her identity as a woman by examining her role as a mother, wife, and professor. It did take her ten years to write the poems that make up this collection as she gained more inspiration from events that were happening in society such as the American Feminist movement.

Ostriker's books of nonfiction explore many of the same themes manifest in her verse. They include Writing Like a Woman (1983), which explores the poems of Sylvia Plath, Anne Sexton, H.D., May Swenson and Adrienne Rich, and The Nakedness of the Fathers: Biblical Visions and Revisions (1994), which approaches the Torah with a midrashic sensibility. She wrote the introduction to Giannina Braschi's Empire of Dreams, a postmodern poetry classic of the Spanish Caribbean (1994).

Ostriker's sixth collection of poems, The Imaginary Lover (1986), won the William Carlos Williams Award of the Poetry Society of America. The poems included in this collection had a feminist voice, probably due to fact that at the same time, she was doing research for her second feminist criticism book, Stealing the Language: the Emergence of Women Poets in America. In The Imaginary Lover, Ostriker examines the fantasies associated with womanhood by discussing topics such as mother-daughter relationships and marriage. The Crack in Everything (1996) was a National Book Award finalist, and won the Paterson Poetry Award and the San Francisco State Poetry Center Award. The Little Space: Poems Selected and New, 1968–1998 was also a 1998 National Book Award finalist.

Green Age (1989) was Ostriker's most visionary and successful collection of poems. Themes analyzed in this collection was time, history and politics, and inner spirituality and how these helped her heal. Ostriker highlights how there is a lack of feminist spirituality in traditional religions.

Ostriker's most recent nonfiction book is For the Love of God (2007), a work that continues her midrash exploration of biblical texts begun with Feminist Revision and the Bible (1993) and The Nakedness of the Fathers:  Biblical Visions and Revisions (1994). Dancing at the Devil's Party (2000) examines the work of poets from William Blake and Walt Whitman to Maxine Kumin. Early in the introduction to the book, she disagrees with W. H. Auden's assertion that poetry makes nothing happen. Poetry, Ostriker writes, "can tear at the heart with its claws, make the neural nets shiver, flood us with hope, despair, longing, ecstasy, love, anger, terror".

Ostriker's poems have appeared in a wide variety of periodicals, including The New Yorker, The Nation, Poetry, American Poetry Review, Paris Review, The Atlantic, Yale Review, Kenyon Review, Iowa Review, Shenandoah Review, Antaeus, Colorado Review, Denver  Quarterly, Boulevard, Poetry East, New England Review, Santa Monica Review, Triquarterly Review, Seneca Review, Ms., Ontario Review, Bridges, Tikkun, Prairie Schooner, Gettysburg Review, Lyric, Fence, and Ploughshares.

A variety of Ostriker's poems have been translated into Italian, French, German, Spanish, Chinese, Japanese, Hebrew and Arabic. Stealing the Language has been translated into Japanese and published in Japan. Her fifty-year poetry career is the subject of a collection of essays by American poets and feminist literary scholars, entitled "Every Woman Her Own Theology".

Honors, fellowships, and awards

1964-1965 American Association of University Women Fellowship
1966 Rutgers University Research Council summer scholar grant
1967 American Foundation for the Advancement of Humanities Younger Scholar Grant
1974, 1976, 1985, 1997, 2000 MacDowell Colony Fellow
1976-1977 National Foundation for the Arts Fellowship in Poetry
1977 Breadloaf Writers' Conference Fellowship
1977 New Jersey Arts Council Award in Poetry
1979 A Dream of Springtime selected as one of the best small press titles
1982 Rockefeller Foundation Fellowship for Research in the Humanities
1984-1985 Guggenheim Foundation Fellowship for Poetry
1986 Strousse Poetry Prize, Prairie Schooner
1986 Poetry Society of America William Carlos Williams Prize for The Imaginary Lover
1987 Rutgers University Trustees Award for Excellence in Research
Summer 1987 Djerassi Foundation Resident
1992 New Jersey Arts Council Award in Poetry
1994 Edward Stanley Award, for poems published in Prairie Schooner
1994 Judah Magnes Jewish Museum, Berkeley, Anna David Rosenberg Award for Poems on the Jewish Experience.  First Prize for "The Eighth and Thirteenth."
1995 Rutgers University Faculty of Arts and Sciences Award for Distinguished Contributors to Undergraduate Education
1995-6 Fellow, Rutgers Center for Historical Analysis
1996-7 Associate Fellow, Rutgers Center for Historical Analysis
1996 Poem in The Best American Poetry
1996 Poem in Yearbook of American Poetry
1997 Paterson Poetry Prize for The Crack in Everything
1998 San Francisco State Poetry Center Award for The Crack in Everything
1998 Readers’ Choice Award for poems published in Prairie Schooner
February 1999 Residency at the Villa Serbelloni, Bellagio Study and Conference Center, Italy
1999 Poem in Pushcart Prize Anthology
2000 San Diego Women's Institute for Continuing Jewish Education: Endowment Award
Fall 2001 Visiting Fellowship, Clare Hall, Cambridge
2002 Larry Levis Prize for poems published in Prairie Schooner
2003 Best American Essays Notable Essay for “Milk.”
2003 Geraldine R. Dodge Foundation Fellow
2007 Anderbo Poetry Prize distinguished poem
2008 Outstanding Academic Title, Choice June 2008, for For the Love of God.
2009 National Jewish Book Award in Poetry for The Book of Seventy
2010 Prairie Schooner Virginia Faulkner Award for Excellence in Writing, for poems published in the summer 2009 issue.
2010 Paterson Award for Sustained Literary Achievement for The Book of Seventy
2011 Named in the list of “10 Great Jewish Poets” in Moment
2017 National Jewish Book Award in the Poetry category for Waiting for the Light 
2018 Named 11th New York State Poet

Finalists 

 1996 The Crack in Everything finalist  for a National Book Award
1998 The Little Space finalist for a National Book Award
1999 The Little Space finalist for Lenore Marshall Prize, Academy of American Poets

Bibliography

Poetry

Collections

Once More Out of Darkness and Other Poems. Berkeley: Berkeley Poets' Press, 1974.  
A Dream of Springtime: Poems 1970–1978. New York: Smith/Horizon Press, 1979.  
The Mother/Child Papers. Los Angeles: Momentum Press, 1980. Rpt. Beacon Press, 1986, Pittsburgh, 2008.  

The Imaginary Lover. Pittsburgh: University of Pittsburgh Press, 1986.  
Green Age. Pittsburgh: University of Pittsburgh Press, 1989.  
The Crack in Everything. Pittsburgh: University of Pittsburgh Press, 1996.  
The Little Space: Poems Selected and New, 1968–1998. 1998, University of Pittsburgh.  
The Volcano Sequence. Pittsburgh: University of Pittsburgh Press, 2002. 
No Heaven.  Pittsburgh:  University of Pittsburgh Press, 2005.   
The Book of Seventy. Pittsburgh: University of Pittsburgh Press, 2009,  
At the Revelation Restaurant and Other Poems, Marick Press, 2010, 
The Book of Life: Selected Poems 1979-2011, Pittsburgh: The University of Pittsburgh Press, 2012
The Old Woman, the Tulip, and the Dog,  University of Pittsburgh Press, 2014, 
Waiting for the Light, University of Pittsburgh Press, 2017,

Poems

Critical and scholarly books
Vision and Verse in William Blake.  Madison: University of Wisconsin Press, 1965, 
William Blake: the Complete Poems.  New York: Penguin Books, 1977.  Edited with Notes, pp. 870–1075.  

Stealing the Language: The Emergence of Women's Poetry in America. Boston: Beacon 1986,  
Feminist Revision and the Bible: the Bucknell Lectures on Literary Theory.  London and Cambridge, Mass.: Blackwell 1993.  
Empire of Dreams, poetry by Giannina Braschi; introduction by Alicia Ostriker, Yale University Press, 1994.
 
Dancing at the Devil’s Party: Essays on Poetry, Politics and the Erotic. Ann Arbor: University of Michigan Press Poets on Poetry series 2000.

Popular culture 

 Alicia Ostriker's poem “A Young Woman, a Tree” appears in Kurt Cobain's posthumously published Journals.
 in Giannina Braschi's Spanglish novel Yo-Yo Boing! (1998), poets and philosophers discuss the state of American poetry and mention Stealing the Language.

References

Further reading

Poets on the Psalms featuring Alicia Ostriker. Edited by Lynn Domina (Trinity University Press, 2008).
Sin:Selected Poems of Forugh Farrokhzad. 
No Heaven (Pitt Poetry Series) 
The Crack In Everything (Pitt Poetry Series) 
The Mother/Child Papers.  University of Pittsburgh Press, 2009.  

1937 births
Living people
American feminist writers
20th-century American poets
21st-century American poets
Jewish poets
Jewish American poets
Brandeis University alumni
People from Princeton, New Jersey
Poets from New Jersey
University of Wisconsin–Madison alumni
William Blake scholars
American women poets
20th-century American women writers
21st-century American women writers
Poets Laureate of New York (state)